The Crash X Aniversario, also known as The Crash Decimo Aniversario (Spanish for The Crash 10th Anniversary Show), was a professional wrestling supercard event, scripted and produced by the Mexican lucha libre promotion The Crash Lucha Libre, which took place on November 5, 2021 at Auditorio Fausto Gutierrez in The Crash's home town of Tijuana, Baja California. It was the fifth event under The Crash Aniversario chronology. The event commemorated the creation of The Crash Lucha Libre in November 2011 and is their biggest show of the year.

Production

Background
The Crash Lucha Libre began operating on 2011, focusing mainly on promotion professional wrestling event in Tijuana, Baja California, Mexico. Their first show was held on November 4, 2011 with a main event of El Hijo del Santo and Latin Lover defeating El Hijo del Solitario and Marco Corleone. The Crash held shows on a limited schedule over the next couple of years; 4 in 2012, 4 in 2013, 2 in 2014, and 5 in 2015.

The group held The Crash V Aniversario show on November 26, 2016, the first time they billed one of their shows as a direct celebration of their anniversary. They continued the tradition in 2017 (The Crash VI Aniversario) and 2018 (The Crash VII Aniversario).

Storylines
The Crash X Aniversario show featured six professional wrestling matches scripted by The Crash with some wrestlers involved in scripted feuds. The wrestlers portray either heels (referred to as rudos in Mexico, those that play the part of the "bad guys") or faces (técnicos in Mexico, the "good guy" characters) as they perform in the ring.

Results

References

2021 in professional wrestling
November 2021 events in Mexico
Professional wrestling in Mexico
The Crash Lucha Libre shows
Professional wrestling anniversary shows